"Lady, Your Roof Brings Me Down" is a song by Scott Weiland first appearing on the Great Expectations Soundtrack and then later on his debut album 12 Bar Blues. The song features the stylistic guest-accordion work of Sheryl Crow.

Personnel
Sheryl Crow - Accordion
Joel Derouin - Violin
Victor Indrizzo - Piano, Guitar, Drums, Additional Vocals
Susie Katayama - Cello
Blair Lamb - Producer
Martyn LeNoble - Bass
Robin Lorentz - Violin
Novi Novog - Viola
Scott Weiland - Vocals, Synthesizer

Charts

References

1997 singles
Scott Weiland songs
Songs written by Scott Weiland
Songs written by Victor Indrizzo
1997 songs
Atlantic Records singles